Sethurama Iyer CBI is a 2004 Malayalam-language mystery crime film directed by K Madhu.The movie is written by S. N. Swami, and The movie stars Mammootty in titular role. Actors Mukesh and Jagathy Sreekumar played important supporting roles. Shyam composed the background score for the film.

This film is the third in the series of the CBI investigative thrillers featuring Mammootty as CBI officer Sethurama Iyer.This film was a Blockbuster and was the highest-grossing film of the year collecting around distributors share of ₹4 crore and a gross around ₹10 crore The success of this movie made Mammootty "Man of the year" The base story and initial scenes are adopted from Arthur Hailey's Novel Detective.

Plot 
The movie begins with Sethurama Iyer visiting Isow Alex, a convicted serial killer who is awaiting his execution. Alex was arrested and convicted for the cold-blooded murder of seven people in two different families. Alex, who had been living a wild life then, had committed the crime high on narcotic drugs. The murder case was left to the CBI for investigation and an able officer, played by Siddique, nabbed Alex in no time. Alex is now a new man, mainly due to the influence of a priest, who requests Iyer to visit Alex.

What Alex tells Iyer is startling; he didn't commit one of the seven murders he was convicted for. The murder was that of Manikkunju, a businessman. Manikkunju, along with his daughter-in-law Mosi, was murdered at his house. Alex tells this all the same confessing that he murdered Mosi. The possibility of another killer involved is very remote and Alex is a serial killer who thoroughly denied any hand in the murders when he was arrested, but yet Iyer decides to reopen the case and investigate. He faces many odds; to prove Alex right would be proving his own bureau wrong and to prove Alex wrong would be wasting time and money.

Cast

Production 
Originally, the CBI officer in the film Oru CBI Diary Kuruppu was supposed to be a rough-and-tough cop named Ali Imran. It was Mammootty who suggested that a simple-looking brahmin who uses his brains more than his brawn would be a better idea.

Box office 
The film was commercial success and highest grossing Malayalam film of the year 2004 and also collected around ₹10 crore from the box office. The film ran around 200 days in theatres.

References

External links 
 

2004 films
2000s Malayalam-language films
Indian sequel films
CBIDiary3
Indian thriller films
Films with screenplays by S. N. Swamy
Films scored by Shyam (composer)
Central Bureau of Investigation in fiction
Films directed by K. Madhu
2004 thriller films